Gereja Ayam is the common nickname for an unusually shaped church in the area of Magelang in Central Java, Indonesia. The nickname, which translates to "chicken church" in English, arose because the structure's shape resembles a hen to most onlookers, although the builder intended it to be the shape of a dove.

The building was erected during the 1990s by Daniel Alamsjah, who claimed to have been inspired by God to build a prayer house through a dream he had in 1989. Alamsjah is Christian, but envisioned Gereja Ayam as a place to welcome followers of any religion for prayer or meditation.

Due to financial difficulties and local resistance, the construction was never finished. The construction was halted in 2000 and the building has since largely been left to deteriorate. In spite of this, in recent years the place has become reasonably frequented by tourists, as well as by couples seeking either to take wedding photographs or to be wed in the building. Besides serving in a religious capacity, the building has also been used to rehabilitate disabled children or drug addicts, or as an insane asylum. Following depictions of the site in several films over the past decade, the church has achieved a level of fame and is now a tourist attraction. It's popularity with tourists has led to the building of a cafe in the chicken's rear selling drinks and Indonesian snacks.

The documentary Into the Inferno from 2016 devotes a segment to the church. It argues that the church was intended to have a connection with a local volcano, as the head of the dove points in the direction of the volcano.

References 

Churches in Java

Abandoned buildings and structures